Ambrose Agius, O.S.B. (17 September 1856 – 13 December  1911) was a Maltese Archbishop of the Catholic Church.

A member of the Benedictine Order, Agius was appointed the Apostolic Delegate to the Philippines by Pope Pius X in 1904. Agius was delegated to canonically crown the image of Our Lady of La Naval de Manila in 1907. He founded the first Benedictine monastery in Malta, and consecrated the first Filipino bishop in the Catholic Church.

Early life
Agius was born on 17 September  1856, in the Egyptian city of Alexandria (then under the Ottoman Empire), the second son (third child) of a Maltese merchant named Tancredi Agius and his wife Saveria Sammut. Tancredi's children were:

 Edward Agius: 1849 - 1924
 Giulia Agius: 1854 - 1932
 Tancredi Alfred: 1856 - 1911
 Edgar Agius: 1864 - 1935
 Robert Agius: 1868 - 1874

Agius was baptized as Tancredi Alfred Agius at Saint Catherine's Cathedral in Alexandria on 5 November 1856. He returned with his family to Malta during his early years. Agius attended the college operated by the monks of Abbey of Saint Augustine in Ramsgate Kent, England, where he was an outstanding student. After he had completed his studies in 1872, he felt called to join the monastic community of the abbey. At his first profession of monastic vows, he was given the religious name of  Ambrose. On 12 October 1873, he professed his perpetual vows and was then sent by his abbot to Rome to complete his studies in philosophy and theology.

Priesthood

Agius was ordained into the Catholic priesthood on 16 October 1881, at Subiaco Abbey.

He became greatly immersed in Maltese culture as he traveled extensively in his early years. 
 
In May 1881, Agius was instructed by the Holy See to open the first Catholic monastery in Malta. In December 1881, Agius, along with a group of Benedictine monks settled in Nigret, Żurrieq. Under his supervision, a canonical religious community was begun, and a novitiate open to international candidates was set up. It was dedicated to the Immaculate Conception.

In 1884, the monastery was closed due to Italian-Maltese political turmoil, and Agius returned to Ramsgate to continue his religious mission. In 1893, he was appointed secretary to the Procurator of the Subiaco Congregation by Pope Leo XIII.

Appointment to the Philippines

 
On 24 August 1904, Pope Pius X appointed Agius as the Apostolic Delegate to the Philippines. He was appointed Titular Archbishop of Palmyra on 3 September 1904, and received his episcopal consecration on 18 September 1904, at Sant'Ambrogio della Massima in Rome by the Cardinal Secretary of State Rafael Merry del Val. Upon his appointment, Agius donated his celebration funds to the impoverished parishioners of the Basilica of Sant'Ambrogio.

In the Philippines, Agius canonically crowned the ivory statue of the Our Lady of the Most Holy Rosary of La Naval de Manila on 5 October 1907, representing Pope Pius.
 
Agius convoked the 1907 Provincial Council of Manila with the other bishops of the nation at Manila Cathedral, re-dedicating the Philippines to the Immaculate Conception, which later became the country's official patroness under the pontificate of Pope Pius XII in September 1942.

As Filipinos were previously barred from priestly ordinations and officially joining religious orders under Spanish colonial rule, on 29 June 1906, Agius ordained the first Filipino bishop in the Roman Catholic Church, Jorge Barlin y Imperial.

Death and burial
On November 1911, Pope Pius appointed Agius as the new Papal Legate to the United States. While preparing to travel to Rome, he died of an acute attack of peritonitis on December 13, at 55 years of age. On 15 December 1911, Agius was given a solemn Requiem Mass and was buried in the underground crypt of the Cathedral Basilica of the Immaculate Conception in Manila. The tomb survived the destruction of the cathedral due to bombing during the Battle of Manila in 1945. His remains were set into a smaller casket and moved to a new grave inside the Benedictine Abbey Church of Our Lady of Montserrat in Manila. The inscription translates as:

A memorial plaque was added to those for all the monks of Ramsgate Abbey in St Augustine's Church, Ramsgate with an inscription that translates as:

Nicknames
Agius was baptised as Tancredi Alfred Agius but was called Alfredo by his Italian-speaking parents or Alfred, when at school in Ramsgate (1871 Census). After taking his perpetual vows Agius became known as Dom Ambrose but was commonly referred to as Padre Ambrosio, Padre Ambo or Father Dom by the Filipino and Maltese faithful who knew him.

See also

 Archdiocese of Manila
 History of religion in Malta

References

1856 births
1911 deaths
People from Alexandria
Maltese Benedictines
19th-century Maltese Roman Catholic priests
19th-century Roman Catholic archbishops in the Philippines
20th-century Roman Catholic archbishops in the Philippines
Benedictine bishops
Apostolic Nuncios to the Philippines
19th-century Roman Catholic titular archbishops
Maltese expatriates in the Philippines
Filipino people of Maltese descent
Egyptian people of Maltese descent